Dreyer is a common German surname originating from Grübe in Holstein Germany. Notable people with the surname include:

Benjamin Dreyer  (1958– ), American writer and copy editor
Benedikt Dreyer (1495–1555), German sculptor, carver and painter
Carl Theodor Dreyer (1889–1968), Danish director
Dave Dreyer (1894–1967, US composer & pianist
Dekker Dreyer (1980– ), American director and producer
Edward L. Dreyer (1940–2007), American historian of Ming China
Frederic Charles Dreyer (1878–1956), officer of the Royal Navy
Gordon Dreyer (1914–2003), English footballer
Harry Dreyer (1892–1953), English footballer
Henry Dreyer (1911–1986), American athlete
Jake Dreyer (born 1992), American guitarist for the band Witherfall and Iced Earth
Jim Dreyer (1963— ), marathon swimmer
John Louis Emil Dreyer (1852–1926), Danish-British astronomer
Malu Dreyer (born 1961), German politician (SPD)
Olaf Dreyer, German theoretical physicist
Pam Dreyer (1981— ), American ice hockey player
Peter Dreyer (1939— ), South African writer and politician
Rosalie Dreyer (1895–1987), Swiss-born naturalized British nurse and administrator

See also
Dreyer's, an ice cream brand
Dreyer objects, a former way of referring to NGC objects
Dreier (disambiguation)

Germanic-language surnames